The Bolivia–Chile border is an international border of South America. It separates Bolivia from Chile along Cordillera Occidental on the western edge of the Altiplano Plateau. There is an ongoing dispute about the nature of Silala River and Chile's use of its waters.

Since 2021 the Bolivia–Chile border has been a major point of entry of irregular Venezuelan migrants into Chile. Migrants are aided in the crossing by human smugglers. Irregular migration has been particularly troublesome for the Chilean border town of Colchane. 

Indigenous Aymara communities live on both sides of the border.

References 

 
Chile
Borders of Chile
International borders
Geography of Arica y Parinacota Region
Geography of Tarapacá Region
Geography of Antofagasta Region